Joseph Nathaniel Perry (born April 18, 1948) is an American prelate of the Roman Catholic Church who has been serving as an auxiliary bishop for the Archdiocese of Chicago since 1998

Perry is a past vice-president of the board of the National Black Catholic Congress, and chairman of the US Conference of Catholic Bishops (USCCB) Subcommittee on African-American Affairs.  He is also a supporter and celebrant of the Traditional Latin Mass, and has celebrated pontifical high masses, ordinations, and confirmations according to the traditional rite.

Biography

Early life and education
A native of Chicago, Joseph Perry was born on April 18, 1948.  He  attended various Catholic elementary schools in Chicago between 1954 and 1962. In 1963, he attended Carver High School in Chicago for one year before transferring to St. Lawrence Seminary High School in Mt. Calvary, Wisconsin.

In 1967, Perry entered the Capuchin Seminary of St. Mary in Crown Point, Indiana where he studied through 1971.  He then attended Saint Joseph's College in Rensselaer, Indiana, receiving a Bachelor of Philosophy degree and a Bachelor of Theology degree.  Perry then entered St. Francis Seminary in St. Francis, Wisconsin, receiving a Master of Divinity degree in 1975.

Ordination and ministry
On May 24, 1975, Perry was ordained a priest by Archbishop William Cousins for the Archdiocese of Milwaukee.  After his ordination, he was assigned as associate pastor at St. Nicholas Parish in Milwaukee.  In 1976, Perry  was appointed to the archdiocesan tribunal.  Between 1979 and 1981, Perry attended Catholic University of America in Washington, D.C., obtaining a Licentiate of Canon Law.  After receiving his licentiate, Perry returned to the tribunal, where he was appointed chief judicial officer in 1983.  At the same time, he started teaching canon law at Sacred Heart School of Theology in Hales Corners, Wisconsin.

In 1995, Perry permanently left the tribunal to return to pastoral work with an assignment as pastor of All Saints Parish in Milwaukee.  In 1996. he began teaching canon law at Marquette University Law School in Milwaukee and in 1997 at Mundelein Seminary in Mundelein, Illinois.

Auxiliary Bishop of Chicago
On May 5, 1998, Pope John Paul II appointed Perry as an auxiliary bishop of the Archdiocese of Chicago and the titular bishop of Lead. He was consecrated on June 29, 1998 by Cardinal Francis George.  He was then appointed the episcopal vicar for Vicariate VI of the archdiocese.

Membership and appointments
In 2010, Cardinal Francis George named Perry as the diocesan postulator for the sainthood cause of Father Augustus Tolton, a former slave who became the first known African-American priest in the Catholic Church.

Perry is chair of the USCCB Committee on African American Catholics. He has also served on several other USCCB committees, including those for Education, Home Missions; the Ad Hoc Committee on Catholics' Use of Holy Scripture; the Secretariat for Family, Laity, Women and Youth; and the Ad Hoc Committee for a Plenary Council, the Catholic Campaign for Human Development, the subcommittee for the Defense of Marriage and the subcommittee for Migrants, Refugees and Travelers.

Since 1977, Perry has been a member of the Canon Law Society of America (CLSA). In 1998, he sat on the board of advisors of Archbishop Quigley Preparatory Seminary in Chicago.  In addition, he is an episcopal liaison for catechetics and Liturgical Training Publications (LTP) of the archdiocese, and is a judge sitting on the Ecclesiastical Court of Appeals for the dioceses in Illinois.

See also

 Catholic Church hierarchy
 Catholic Church in the United States
 Historical list of the Catholic bishops of the United States
 List of Catholic bishops of the United States
 Lists of patriarchs, archbishops, and bishops

References

External links
 Biography from the Archdiocese of Chicago
 Biography from the National Black Catholic Congress
 National Black Catholic Clergy Caucus
 Roman Catholic Archdiocese of Chicago

1948 births
Living people
21st-century American Roman Catholic titular bishops
Roman Catholic Archdiocese of Chicago
Christianity in Chicago
Clergy from Chicago
Roman Catholic Archdiocese of Milwaukee
Sacred Heart School of Theology alumni
Saint Joseph's College (Indiana) alumni
St. Francis Seminary (Wisconsin) alumni
Marquette University faculty
University of St. Mary of the Lake faculty
African-American Roman Catholic bishops
Religious leaders from Illinois
Religious leaders from Milwaukee
Catholics from Illinois
20th-century American Roman Catholic titular bishops
21st-century African-American people
20th-century African-American people